Zygmunt Bogdziewicz (5 June 1941 – 19 March 2016) was a Polish sports shooter. He competed at the 1972 Summer Olympics and the 1976 Summer Olympics.

References

1941 births
2016 deaths
Olympic shooters of Poland
Polish male sport shooters
Shooters at the 1972 Summer Olympics
Shooters at the 1976 Summer Olympics
Sportspeople from Kaunas
Lithuanian Soviet Socialist Republic people